Magnus Andersson may refer to:
Magnus Andersson (footballer, born 1958), former Swedish footballer
Magnus Andersson (footballer, born 1981), Swedish football midfielder
Magnus Andersson (guitarist) (born 1956), Swedish classical guitarist
Magnus Andersson (handballer) (born 1966), Swedish handball player
Magnus Andersson (Centre Party Youth politician) (born 1981), Swedish politician
Magnus Andersson (Pirate politician) (born 1974), leader of the Pirate Party of Sweden

See also
Magnus Andersen (disambiguation)